The 2012 FIBA U20 European Championship Division B was the 8th edition of the Division B of the European basketball championship for men's national under-20 teams. It was played from 12 to 22 July 2012 in Sofia, Bulgaria.

Participating teams
  (15th place, 2011 FIBA Europe Under-20 Championship Division A)

  (16th place, 2011 FIBA Europe Under-20 Championship Division A)

First round
In the first round, the teams were drawn into four groups. The first two teams from each group advance to the quarterfinal round; the other teams will play in the 9th–18nd place classification groups.

Group A

Group B

Group C

Group D

Quarterfinal round
In this round, the teams play in two groups. The first two teams from each group advance to the semifinals; the other teams will play the 5th–8th place playoffs.

Group E

Group F

9th–18th place classification
In this round, the teams play in two groups of five. The first teams from each group advance to the 9th place match; the second teams advance to the 11th place match; the third teams advance to the 13th place match; the fourth teams advance to the 15th place match; the last teams advance to the 17th place match.

Group G

Group H

17th place match

15th place match

13th place match

11th place match

9th place match

5th−8th place playoffs

5th–8th place semifinals

7th place match

5th place match

Championship playoffs

Semifinals

3rd place match

Final

Final standings

See also
2012 FIBA Europe Under-20 Championship (Division A)

References

FIBA U20 European Championship Division B
FIBA Europe Under-20 Championship Division B
2012–13 in Bulgarian basketball
International youth basketball competitions hosted by Bulgaria
Sports competitions in Sofia
July 2012 sports events in Europe
FIBA Europe U-20 Championship Division B
FIBA U20